Biotechnology and Bioprocess Engineering is a peer-reviewed bimonthly scientific journal published by Springer Science+Business Media on behalf of the Korean Society for Biotechnology and Bioengineering. Biotechnology and Bioprocess Engineering covers all aspects of biotechnology and bioengineering. The editor-in-chief of the journal is Jong Won Yun (Daegu University) and Sang Yup Lee (KAIST). The founding editors-in-chief were Cha-Yong Choi (Seoul National University), Ho Nam Chang (Korea Advanced Institute of Science and Technology), and Sun Bok Lee (POSTECH).

Abstracting and indexing
The journal is abstracted and indexed in EMBASE, EMBiology, Food Science and Technology Abstracts, IBIDS, International Abstracts in Operations Research, Science Citation Index Expanded, and Scopus. According to the Journal Citation Reports, its 2021 impact factor is 3.386

References

External links
 

Biotechnology journals
Bimonthly journals
Springer Science+Business Media academic journals
English-language journals
Publications established in 1996